Spencer Walker Luckey is an American artist and president of Luckey Climbers, a design/fabrication firm that specializes in climbing sculptures for children's museums  and other institutions world-wide.

Biography 
Spencer was raised in Short Beach, Connecticut by artist Tom Luckey and Elizabeth Mason. He attended the Foote School, followed by Northfield Mount Hermon and is a graduate of Connecticut College and Yale School of Architecture. He is married to artist Briah Uhl, and they have a son, Clyde.

Luckey LLC 
Spencer took over operations in 2006 after his father, Tom Luckey, became paralyzed. Spencer has been responsible for the design, fabrication and installation of the climbers. While the head of Luckey Climbers, Spencer has introduced digitally-based techniques of shaping and structural analysis, his work marks a departure from the analogue mode of his father. Luckey Climbers has expanded internationally.

Projects

Luckey (2008)
Spencer and his family are featured in the documentary Luckey, which focuses on Luckey Climbers in the aftermath of the accident which left Tom Luckey paralyzed. The film was shown at SxSW and other festivals, as well as on the Sundance Channel.

References

External links
 
 

1970 births
Yale School of Architecture alumni
Sculptors from Connecticut
Living people
Northfield Mount Hermon School alumni
Connecticut College alumni